Fight That Ghost is a 1946 feature horror comedy film. It is considered one of the earliest horror films with an all Black cast. It was directed by Sam Newfield. It was a Toddy Pictures Company release. Bill Dillard portrayed Jim Brown in the film. The film includes the songs "Take me" by Porter Grainger as well as "Hard Luck Blues" and "A Brown Skin Gal is the Best Gal After All" by John Murray.

It was one of several films Newfield directed for Toddy including Harlem on the Prairie, Mantan Messes Up, and House-Rent Party. Photo stills for the film exist.

Cast
Pigmeat "Alamo" Markham as Pigmeat [Markham]
John "Rastus" Murray as Shorty
Percy Verwayne as Moneybags Jim
David Bethea as Mr. Cook
Alberta Pryne as Sweet Sue
Bill Dillard as Jim Brown

Further reading
Gevinson, Alan. Within Our Gates: Ethnicity in American Feature Films, 1911-1960. United Kingdom, University of California Press, 1997.
Richards, Larry. African American Films Through 1959: A Comprehensive, Illustrated Filmography. United States: McFarland, Incorporated, Publishers, 1998.
Watkins, Mel. On the Real Side: A History of African American Comedy. United States, Chicago Review Press, 1999.

References

1946 horror films
African-American comedy horror films
Films directed by Sam Newfield
1940s American films